Yannick Kergoat is a film editor.  He has edited such films as Indigènes,  Gothika, Not For, or Against (Quite the Contrary) and Le Couperet.

He won a César Award in the Best Editing category for his work on Harry un ami qui vous veut du bien.

Decorations 
 Chevalier of the Order of Arts and Letters (2016)

References

External links

Living people
French film editors
Year of birth missing (living people)
César Award winners
Place of birth missing (living people)
Chevaliers of the Ordre des Arts et des Lettres